A total solar eclipse occurred on Monday, July 10, 1972. A solar eclipse occurs when the Moon passes between Earth and the Sun, thereby totally or partly obscuring the image of the Sun for a viewer on Earth. A total solar eclipse occurs when the Moon's apparent diameter is larger than the Sun's, blocking all direct sunlight, turning day into darkness. Totality occurs in a narrow path across Earth's surface, with the partial solar eclipse visible over a surrounding region thousands of kilometres wide. Occurring only 2.9 days after perigee (Perigee on July 7, 1972), the Moon's diameter was relatively large.

It was visible as a total eclipse along a path of totality that began in Sea of Okhotsk and traversed the far eastern portions of the Soviet Union (which now belongs to Russia), northern Alaska in the United States, Northern Canada, eastern Quebec and the Canadian Maritimes. A partial eclipse was visible over Siberia, Canada and the northern and eastern United States.

Related eclipses

Eclipses in 1972
 An annular solar eclipse on Sunday, 16 January 1972.
 A total lunar eclipse on Sunday, 30 January 1972.
 A total solar eclipse on Monday, 10 July 1972.
 A partial lunar eclipse on Wednesday, 26 July 1972.

Solar eclipses of 1971–1974

Saros 126

Metonic series

"You're So Vain"
The eclipse is referenced in the lyrics of Carly Simon's 1972 hit song "You're So Vain." The subject of the song, after witnessing his racehorse win "naturally" at the Saratoga Race Course, flies his Learjet to Nova Scotia to see the eclipse; Simon uses the two phenomena as examples of how the subject seems to be "where (he) should be all the time." Simon released the song four months after the eclipse.

Notes

References

 Foto solar eclipse of July 10, 1972 in Russia
 Foto solar eclipse of July 10, 1972 in Russia (2)
 Image solar eclipse of July 10, 1972

1972 in science
1972 07 10
July 1972 events in North America